Faqih Ahmadan (also Romanized as Faqīh Aḩmadan; also known as Faqīh Ahmad, Fagīh Aḩmadān, Faqih Ahmed, and Faqīh-he Aḩmadān) is a village in Cheghapur Rural District, Kaki District, Dashti County, Bushehr Province, Iran. At the 2006 census, its population was 27, in 8 families.

References 

Populated places in Dashti County